= Union AG =

Swiss embroidery company

- Formerly: Hoffmann, Huber & Co. (1892–1909)
- Company type: Joint-stock company
- Industry: Textiles, embroidery
- Founded: 1759 in St. Gallen, Switzerland
- Founder: Ulrich Vonwiller
- Headquarters: St. Gallen, Switzerland
- Products: Embroidery, fine fabrics
- Number of employees: 70 in Switzerland, 320 abroad (2009)
- Parent: Gebrüder Leemann AG (from 1978)
- Website: https://union-ag.com

Union AG, historically known as the Stickereihaus Union, is a Swiss embroidery company based in St. Gallen. Founded in 1759, it traded in textiles and later specialized in embroidery.

== History ==
The company was founded in St. Gallen in 1759 by the weaver and merchant Ulrich Vonwiller, who began by trading in linen, fustian, and muslin, and from 1800 in hand-made embroidery. It exported its products mainly to France, Spain, Italy, and the East, and from 1850 increasingly to the United States. It took the name Hoffmann, Huber & Co. in 1892 and then Union AG in 1909, in reference to its principal market, the United States. It was bought by Gebrüder Leemann AG in 1978 (Gebrüder Leemann Holding AG from 1992).

After the worldwide economic crisis, the firm specialized in producing embroidery to decorate women's blouses and precious fabrics for haute couture; from 1980 it concentrated on embroidered lingerie and embroidery for ready-to-wear. It was the first European company in the sector to open a branch in China (1992). In 2009 it employed 70 people in Switzerland and 320 abroad.

== Bibliography ==
- E. Sieber, Stichfest – a Stitch in Time, 2009
